Viktor Wigelbeyer (December 13, 1897 – 1969) was an Austrian bobsledder who competed in the mid-1930s. He finished 13th and last in completing the four runs in the four-man event at the 1936 Winter Olympics in Garmisch-Partenkirchen.

References
1936 bobsleigh four-man results
1936 Olympic Winter Games official report. - p. 415.
Viktor Wigelbeyer's profile at Sports Reference.com

1897 births
1969 deaths
Austrian male bobsledders
Olympic bobsledders of Austria
Bobsledders at the 1936 Winter Olympics